City-As-School (CAS) is a public high school located at 16 Clarkson Street between Hudson Street and Seventh Avenue South in the West Village of Manhattan, New York City which was established in 1972. It is one of America's oldest alternative public high schools.

History
CAS was founded by Frederick J. Koury and Rick Safran in 1972. They chose New York City for the “schoolhouse” and their proposal was approved by the Board of Education of the City of New York. 

CAS received funding from the Board of Education and additional grants from the Ford Foundation, and opened with ten seniors in 1973. To attract students, CAS advertised on WABC radio, targeting students who were considering dropping out. Their first class eventually grew to 61 students.

Administration and organization
City As School is led by Rachel Seher.

Past principals are:
Fred Koury 1972–1989
Rick Safran (acting interim) 1989–1990
Marsha Brevot 1990–1992
Paul Forestieri (acting interim) 1992–1993
Bob Lubetsky 1993–2006
Michael Edwards (acting interim) 2006–2007
Toni Scarpinato 2007–2010
Alan Cheng 2010–2018
Rachel Seher 2018–current

Admissions
Students are required to register for an internship each cycle; a cycle is half the time of a regular semester. Currently, CAS has over 500 open internship relationships. Graduation from CAS requires a portfolio presentation before a panel of adults and peers.

To apply to CAS, a student must be at least 16 years old and have a minimum of 16 high school credits; thus, new students have usually completed about two years of high school elsewhere. Additionally, a personal interview is conducted.

Academics
Although guided by an advisor, students are responsible for registering for classes and internships four times a year. CAS does not use letter grades; students receive either credit (C) or no credit (NC).

Campuses
CAS’s main campus is located at 16 Clarkson Street in Greenwich Village in New York City. There are also two satellite locations: in the Bronx at Tremont Avenue and Bruckner Boulevard, and in Brooklyn on Flatbush Avenue next to the Manhattan Bridge. City-As-School Queens opened in 1995 and closed in 2002. The original school was in a brownstone on Schermerhorn Street in Brooklyn. The first class was held in September 1973.

Notable alumni
Decora (rapper) (born 1984) – hip hop artist, producer, performance poet and social activist
Asa Akira – pornographic actress
Sunny Bak (born 1958) – commercial photographer and celebrity
Jean-Michel Basquiat (1960–1988) – graffiti artist, film director
Michael Dominic (born 1970) – award-winning documentary filmmaker and photojournalist
Julia Fox (born 1990) – actress and model
Adam Horovitz (Ad-rock) of the Beastie Boys (born 1966) – musician/rapper, son of playwright Israel Horovitz
Destiny Frasqueri (Princess Nokia) (born 1992) – rapper, actress
Ephrem Lopez (DJ Enuff) (born 1969) – DJ and radio personality
Ayodele Maakheru – musician, composer, and bandleader, winner of the ASCAP songwriter award (2004)
Franck de Las Mercedes (born 1972) – visual artist
Zoe Leonard (born 1961) – artist
 Mekhi Phifer (born 1974) – film actor
Victor Rasuk: (born 1984) – actor; winner, Independent Spirit Award (2002)
Ryder Ripps (born 1986) – conceptual artist
Seth Zvi Rosenfeld (born 1961) – playwright and screenwriter
Dante Terrell Smith (Mos Def) (born 1973) – musician and actor
Patty Smyth (born 1957) – rock musician; married to tennis star John McEnroe
Vincent Spano (born 1962) – television and film actor
Mia Tyler (born 1978) – Plus-size model, daughter of Aerosmith lead singer Steven Tyler and actress Cyrinda Foxe
Charles Malik Whitfield (born 1970) – film and television actor
Bob Woodruff (singer) (born 1961) – singer, songwriter, musician
Malik Yoba (born 1967) – film and television actor

References

External links

Public high schools in Manhattan
Internship programs